Philipp Weber (born 15 September 1992) is a German handballer for SC Magdeburg and the German national team.

Individual awards
Handball-Bundesliga Top Scorer: 2017

References

External links

1992 births
Living people
People from Schönebeck
German male handball players
HSG Wetzlar players
Handball-Bundesliga players
Handball players at the 2020 Summer Olympics
Sportspeople from Saxony-Anhalt
SC Magdeburg players